Blueberry pie is a pie with a blueberry filling. Blueberry pie is readily made because it does not require pitting or peeling of fruit. It usually has a top and bottom crust. The top crust can be circular, but the pie can also have a crumble crust or no top crust. Blueberry pies are often eaten in the summertime when blueberries are in season in the Northern hemisphere.

History
Blueberries, both wild ('lowbush') and cultivated ('highbush'), are native to North America. Blueberry pie was first eaten by early American settlers and later the food spread to the rest of the world. Similar desserts are prepared in Europe with bilberries. It remains a popular dessert in the United States and Canada. Blueberry pie made with wild Maine blueberries is the official state dessert of the U.S. state of Maine. Blueberry pie has been documented in the Appledore Cook Book in 1872.

Ingredients
A typical ingredient for blueberry pie are rinsed and steamed blueberries. The berries can be frozen or fresh. Other ingredients include flour or instant tapioca, cinnamon, nutmeg, sugar, vanilla and butter. Recipes may vary ingredients.

Nutrients
A 100 gram reference serving of commercially prepared blueberry pie supplies 55 calories, and is 10% fat, 35% carbohydrates, 2% protein, and 52% water (table). It contains 10% of the Daily Value in vitamin K, but otherwise contains no micronutrients in significant content.

Gallery

See also

 List of pies, tarts and flans

References

Fruit pies
American pies
German pies
Symbols of Maine
Blueberries
Thanksgiving food
Christmas food